The 2016 E3 Harelbeke (officially the Record Bank E3 Harelbeke) was a one-day cycling classic that took place on Friday 25 March 2016. It was the 59th edition of the E3 Harelbeke; it was the second one-day race of the 2016 UCI World Tour and the first of the cobbled classics.

The principal difficulty in the race came from the fifteen climbs of hills in the Flemish Ardennes. These mainly came in the second half of the race. The principal favourites for victory were Peter Sagan and Fabian Cancellara.

The race was won by Michał Kwiatkowski. He formed a breakaway  from the finish with Sagan and, despite hard work from the  team and from Cancellara, they came to the finish together. Kwiatkowski comfortably won the sprint and Sagan took second place. Kwiatkowski's teammate Ian Stannard won the group sprint for third place, eleven seconds behind.

Route 

The E3 Harelbeke starts and finishes in the city of Harelbeke in West Flanders. The principal difficulty in the race comes from the climbs – many of them cobbled – that appear in the  route; many of these climbs also appear in the Tour of Flanders, including the Oude Kwaremont and Paterberg. In 2016, there were several changes to the route from previous years, with a shorter distance and fewer climbs; Cycling Weekly suggested that these could make the race slightly easier than previous editions.

The route left Harelbeke to the southeast, crossing the Scheldt river at Kluisbergen and proceeding through the outskirts of Oudenaarde. The first climb was the Katteberg after ; there was then a flat section of cobbled road – the Paddestraat – before the roads turned to the east. The route passed to the north-east of Zottegem, then further east as far as Ninove with  completed. Here the roads turned back to the west into the Flemish Ardennes. The second climb of the day was La Houppe, which came after ; the riders then continued into Ronse, the half-way point of the race, for the cobbled climb of the Oude Kruisberg. There were then seven climbs in the following : the Knokteberg, the Hotondberg, the Kortekeer, the Taaienberg (cobbled), the Boigneberg, the Eikenberg (cobbled) and the Stationsberg (cobbled).

This was then followed after  by the partially cobbled,  climb of the Oude Kwaremont. The penultimate climb of the day was the Karnemelkbeekstraat,  from the finish. At this point, the route crossed back over the Scheldt and returned north-west towards Harelbeke. The final climb, the Tiegemberg, came with  remaining. The last part of the race was flat, with the final  a final loop through Harelbeke to the finish line.

Participating teams 
There were 25 teams selected to start the race. All 18 UCI WorldTeams were automatically invited; the race organisers also gave wildcard invitations to seven UCI Professional Continental teams. These included two Belgian teams ( and ), two French teams ( and ), an Italian team, a Dutch team and a German team. Each team was permitted to enter eight riders.  and  each entered seven riders and 's Greg Van Avermaet withdrew through illness, so 197 riders started the race.

Pre-race favourites 

The 2015 champion, 's Geraint Thomas, was not present to defend his title; he was riding the 2016 Volta a Catalunya instead. Peter Sagan, who won the 2014 race, did start, as did Fabian Cancellara, who had won the race on three occasions in the past, and Tom Boonen, who held the record for the most victories with five. Cancellara was riding the race for the final time, having announced that the 2016 season would be his last as a professional, and was in strong form with victories in the Strade Bianche and a time-trial stage of the 2016 Tirreno–Adriatico. Sagan, the reigning world champion, had also been performing strongly, but did not have any victories so far in 2016. Boonen had not demonstrated any strong form.

Although Boonen had not shown strong form, he came to the race with a strong team. His teammates included Niki Terpstra, Zdeněk Štybar, Stijn Vandenbergh and Matteo Trentin, all of whom were possible winners of the race. Despite Thomas's absence, Sky also brought a strong team: they had Ian Stannard, Luke Rowe and the former world champion Michał Kwiatkowski. Other possible victors included Sep Vanmarcke, Alexander Kristoff, Edvald Boasson Hagen (Dimension Data), Jürgen Roelandts and Lars Boom. Greg Van Avermaet would also have been among the favourites, but he was ruled out of the race due to illness.

Race summary 

After  of racing, an eight-man breakaway formed. The riders involved were Bert De Backer, Antoine Demoitié (Wanty–Groupe Gobert), Nico Denz (AG2R La Mondiale), Tony Hurel (Direct Energie), Sjoerd van Ginneken, Reto Hollenstein, Jay Thomson (Dimension Data), and Wouter Wippert. It was reduced to less than two minutes by the time the riders reached the Taaienberg with  remaining, as Trek put an effort into bringing the lead group back.

On the Taaienberg, Tiesj Benoot (Lotto–Soudal) led the peloton, with Boonen right behind him. A ten-rider group broke away from the peloton over the climb, with Benoot and Boonen joined by Roelandts, Cancellara, Boom, Vanmarcke, Daniel Oss (BMC) and three other Etixx–Quick-Step riders (Terpstra, Štybar and Trentin). On the next climb, the Boigneberg, Cancellara's rear derailleur failed and it took more than a minute for his team to bring him a replacement bike, putting him a long way behind the other favourites. Shortly afterwards, the breakaway was caught by the chasing group; the combined group was then caught by another group that contained Sagan and Kwiatkowski to create a 20-man lead group, although Štybar soon suffered a puncture and fell out of the group. Cancellara, meanwhile, was in a group led by his teammates Yaroslav Popovych and Markel Irizar around two minutes behind.

By the time the race reached the Paterberg, the gap was around half a minute. On the climb, Cancellara attacked from the chasing group, with Štybar on his wheel; meanwhile, a ten-man group broke away from the leaders. After the Paterberg and the subsequent Oude Kwaremont, Cancellara and Štybar eventually reached this group. On the next hill, the Karnemelkbeekstraat, Sagan and Kwiatkowski attacked; over the next  they extended their lead to over 20 seconds. This extended to 30 seconds on the Tiegemberg and reached 36 seconds on the final stretch to Harelbeke. The Etixx–Quick-Step riders were forced to do all the work in the chasing group, as none of the other riders in the group would collaborate with them.

After a long effort from Terpstra, Boonen took up the effort on the front of the chasing group and the gap to Sagan and Kwiatkowski began to reduce. The gap fell to under 11 seconds with  remaining, but the leading pair were not caught. After going under the flamme rouge, Kwiatkowski manoeuvred Sagan to the front and surprised him by opening up his sprint with  remaining. Sagan was unable to respond and Kwiatkowski took the race victory, with Sagan four seconds behind. The chasing group finished 11 seconds behind, with Stannard beating Cancellara in the sprint for third place.

Results

Post-race analysis

Reactions 

Kwiatkowski's victory was his first since joining Team Sky at the beginning of 2016. He said after the race that his main target was still the Ardennes classics rather than the remainder of the cobbled classics season, but that there was no reason why he could not succeed in both. He pointed out that he was glad to have escaped with Sagan as they worked well together – they had arrived at the finish of the 2014 Strade Bianche in a similar situation, with Kwiatkowski the winner there as well. He said that he thought he had surprised Sagan by sprinting first, rather than waiting for Sagan's sprint. He also acknowledged that he knew from his own experience a year before that it was "very difficult" to race with the pressure of the world champion's rainbow jersey.

Sagan revealed that he had been told on the radio that he had to ride hard to stay away from the chasing group, but that he had no power left in the final part of the race as he had done the majority of the work in the breakaway. Nevertheless, he said that he was happy with the race. Cancellara, meanwhile, said that, although he was disappointed with the result in itself, he had pride in the way he had performed in coming back from his mechanical failure. After his long pursuit, with the help of several teammates in different groups, he had barely been able to follow the other riders in the group on the Tiegemberg.

UCI World Tour standings 

In the season-long UCI World Tour competition, Kwiatkowski moved into the top ten thanks to the points won in the race. Sagan, meanwhile, moved from seventh to third, just ten points behind the leader, BMC's Richie Porte. Poland moved into the top ten of the nations' rankings, while Sky remained top in the teams' rankings.

References

Sources

Footnotes

External links 
 
 

E3 Harelbeke
E3 Harelbeke
E3 Harelbeke